Many Inventions (published 1893) is a collection of short stories by Rudyard Kipling. Twelve of the 14 stories appeared previously in various publications, including The Atlantic Monthly and the Strand Magazine.

The title refers to a verse from Ecclesiastes, which is quoted on the title page: "Lo, this only have I found, that God hath made man upright; but they have sought out many inventions."

The stories
The fourteen stories are preceded by a poem, "To the True Romance", and followed by another poem, "Anchor Song".
The Disturber of Traffic
A Conference of the Powers 
My Lord the Elephant
One View of the Question
'The Finest Story in the World'
His Private Honour
A Matter of Fact
The Lost Legion
In the Rukh
'Brugglesmith'
'Love-o’-Women'
The Record of Badalia Herodsfoot
Judson and the Empire
The Children of the Zodiac

References

External links
Many Inventions at Project Gutenberg Australia
Many Inventions at telelib.com
The Kipling Society website

1893 short story collections
Short story collections by Rudyard Kipling